Douglas Lynch may refer to:

 Douglas E. Lynch (born 1964), academic
 Doug Lynch (ice hockey) (born 1983), Canadian ice hockey player
 Douglas Lynch (businessman) (1926–2016), Barbadian businessman and lawyer